Verona Mills is a hamlet in Oneida County, New York, United States. On April 26, 2011, a tornado (classified as EF-1) with 100 mph winds associated with the 2011 Super Outbreak hit a wooded area near Verona Mills, near New York State Route 49, uprooting trees and snapping a power pole.

References

Hamlets in Oneida County, New York
Hamlets in New York (state)